The Park of 28 Panfilov Guardsmen is an urban park located in east-central Almaty in the area surrounding the Ascension Cathedral. It is dedicated to and named after the Panfilov heroes which were the 28 soldiers of an Alma-Ata Infantry unit who allegedly died while defending Moscow from the German invasion during the Second World War. The group took its name from Ivan Panfilov, the General commanding the 316th division which, in spite of heavy casualties, believed at that time managed to significantly delay the Germans advance to Moscow, thus buying the time for the defenders of the city. An eternal flame commemorating the fallen of the World War II and the Eastern Front burns in front of the giant black monument of soldiers from all 15 Soviet republics.

History
The Park was founded in the 1870s on the place of a cossack village cemetery, which was originally named Starokladbischensky Park, meaning Old Cemetery Park which was destroyed in 1921. The only preserved graves that avoided destruction were Kolpakovsky family was daughter Leonilla Kolpakovsky who was buried in 1860 and grandson of Vladimir Basilewski who was buried in 1882; which the gravestone was restored in 2011. Mass grave memorials of victims of the 1887 earthquake are currently lost. Starokladbischensky Park was later connected to the Catholic which it was called Urban Garden. The garden was removed which Andrey Pavlovich Zenkov participated in role of changing the park.
The name of the park changed on a regular basis, in 1899 during the 100th anniversary birth of famous Russian poet, Alexander Pushkin. The park changed its name to Pushkin Garden. Between 1904 and 1907, there was a period of construction on one of Almaty’s few surviving Tsarist-era buildings. In 1913, the park held an agricultural and industrial exhibition for the 300th anniversary of the Romanov dynasty. Architectural and construction part was organized by military engineer Andrey Pavlovich Zenkov. On the eastern part of the territory, new buildings were built in different architectural styles, 28 state-owned and 15 private pavilions. The main avenue of the park along the avenue Kolpakovsky was decorated with yurts, which housed all the diversity of the Kazakh national art, everyday life and crafts. Nearby the Ascension Cathedral, the city council, and the cinema which then was nicknamed "of the twentieth century" were equipped with the first electricity that affected the image of the "Garden City". The park changed its name to the "Park of the Fallen Heroes" in 1919 due to the burial of A. Berezovsky and K. Ovcharov and other heroes who participated in the Red Army during the Russian Civil War which then changed its name to Lenin Local Park with urban cemeteries being prohibited. During the years before 1927, the park was called variously called Gubkompomarma Garden or Public Park of the 1 May. In 1927, during the conversion of Alma-Ata, as the new capital of Soviet Kazakhstan, the park was named Federation of Soviet Republics.

Until 5 May 1942, the park changed into its current name when it was finally renamed in honor of Panfilov soldiers of the 1075 regiment of the 312th rifle division, who having small forces at that time believed that they were able to blunt the German attack at the approaches to Moscow in November 1941. The territory of the Park of 28 Panfilov Guardsmen includes several historical buildings dated back to early and mid-20th century, such as: Ascension Cathedral, erected without a single nail, the Museum of Folk Musical Instruments, and the House of Officers. Nowadays, the park is popular place for the locals and as well for tourists. During the Victory Day celebrations, Almaty citizens usually lay flowers and wreaths to its foot in respect for those killed in World War II. Zenkov played an important role of creating the current modern-day park and as well as improving Almaty. In 1982, he was made into a list of historical and cultural monuments of republican significance of Kazakhstan, which were three sites, located in the Park of 28 Panfilov Guardsmen—the building of the museum of folk instruments, the Ascension Cathedral and the Memorial of Glory.

Renaming
There was a suggestion to rename the current existing name for the park due to the July 2015 publications by the State Archive of the Russian Federation that the military newspaper Krasnaya Zvezda had concocted the story's details of the heroic story. However, there are no considerations by the city officials in renaming the park.

Sights

Ascension Cathedral

Designed by Andrei Pavlovich Zenkov in 1904, a cathedral was built entirely of wood with the belfry being erected on 14 September 1906. The inner structure of the cathedral was made in the artistic workshops of Moscow and Kiev. The iconostasis was painted by N. Khludov. The cathedral survived the 1911 earthquake. After the Russian Revolution the cathedral was used to house the Central State Museum of the Kazakh Soviet Socialist Republic. From 1930 to 1940 it was used by important public organizations. The first radio transmitters in Almaty were situated in the cathedral's belfry. Restoration work on the cathedral began in 1973 and lasted until 1976. In May 1995 control of the cathedral was returned to the Russian Orthodox Church, and after additional restoration work it was reopened for religious services in 1997.

Kazakh Museum of Folk Musical Instruments

In the eastern part of the park, there is the museum of national musical instruments. This wooden building was erected in 1908, simultaneously with Ascension Cathedral. During the period, the military leadership of the Turkestan governor-generalship once met here for ceremonies and state receptions. Later the building was used as the House of Officers until 1980, when the museum of national musical instruments of Kazakhstan was opened here.

The museum was named after known Kazakh musician of 19th and 20th century Ykylas, who promoted the purity of folk culture and preservation of various national instruments. Today, there are more than 1000 items of instruments in collection of the museum, which are divided into 60 types of Kazakh national musical instruments. The collection also includes instruments which were owned by famous singers, improvisers, and composers. The most ancient exhibits are dated back to the 17th century. From the outside, the building is made of wood and resembles the traditional Russian building. On the inside the decoration corresponds to classic Kazakh national patterns. And in front of the building the sculpture of Kazakh bow instrument, Narkobyz is erected. Besides the view of all instruments, the visitors can listen to the sounding of these instruments in the performance of folk ensemble Sazgen.

Monuments

Memorial of Glory 
Memorial of Glory was built in 1975 to the 30th anniversary of the Victory in the Park of the 28 Panfilov Guardsmen from the east side, in the same year the Eternal Flame was lit. The opening of the memorial complex of the four parts was held 8 May 1975. The first part - the high relief "Oath" (on the left side) - is dedicated to the young fighters for Soviet power in Kazakhstan. The central part of the triptych, The Deed, depicts the images of Panfilov heroes who defended Moscow with their breasts. To the right is the composition "Trumpeting Glory", which gives the whole memorial an optimistic sound, its images embody the anthem of triumphant life. Near the Eternal Flame there are massive cubes of labradorite, under which capsules with soil from the heroic cities are immured. It is a monument of art, architecture and history (included in the register on 20 April 1980), included in the Almaty State Historical-Architectural and Memorial Reserve (decree of the Council of Ministers of the Republic of Kazakhstan № 46 25 November 1993).

Monument to Bauyrzhan Momyshuly 
Opened on 10 December 2010 from the north side of the park. The authors of the monument are sculptor Nurlan Dalbai and architect Rasul Satybaldiev. The height of the monument is 6 meters.

Monument to Ivan Panfilov 
Monument to Ivan Panfilov was established in 1968. It is located on the south side of the park. The authors are sculptor B.A. Tulekov and architect T.K. Basenov. The monument-bust is cast in bronze. The height is 2 meters, the pedestal is rectangular of gray granite. It is located at the intersection of Kazybek bi Street and Dostyk Avenue, which starts directly from the park. Behind the monument begins an alley of heroes-panfilovs, which crosses the entire park. In the center of the alley installed granite pedestals on both sides of which are the names of the 28 Panfilov Guardsmen.

The monument is located on a five-stepped stylobate of pink processed granite. On the obverse of the pedestal is a plaque with the years of life, name, surname and rank of Hero of the Soviet Union, Major-General I. Panfilov. The total height of the monument is 3.65 meters. The monument is listed in the state list of monuments of history and culture of local importance of the city of Alma-Ata in the updated version of 2010

Monument to Tokash Bokin 
Installed in 1980 on the west side of the park. Sculptor - B. A. Abishev, architect - Sh. E. Valikhanov. Made in the form of a bust 4.8 meters high.

The belted figure of the revolutionary is carved from gray granite. The composition is symmetrical, axial. Both sides of the monument have stepped disclosures; the western one has the inscription: "Tokash Bokin", the eastern one - the symbol "sickle and hammer" and a five-pointed star as a symbol of Soviet power. The monument is installed on a one-stage stylobate. The monument is oriented to the street Kunayev, there is no direct exit from the park to the monument. Originally, a small bust-monument to Tokash Bokin was erected on this spot in 1967, for the celebration of the 50th anniversary of the October Revolution. The sculptor of the monument was O. Prokopyeva. However, as time passed, the need for a new monument arose. The first version of the bust was dismantled in 1979. The monument is listed in the state list of historical and cultural monuments of local importance in the city of Alma-Ata, as revised in 2010.

Monument to Afghan warriors 
Monument to the Kazakhstani soldiers who died during the civil war in Afghanistan as part of the Limited Contingent of Soviet Forces was opened on 15 February 2003 next to the Memorial of Glory. The sculptor was Kazbek Satybaldin, architects Tokhtar Yeraliev and Vladimir Sidorov. The opening of the monument was timed to coincide with the 14th anniversary of the withdrawal of Soviet troops from Afghanistan. The names and surnames of 69 Alma-Ata citizens who did not return from the Afghan war were carved at the foot of the monument. In total more than 22 thousand Kazakhstani soldiers participated in operations in this Central Asian country.

Three bronze figures of soldiers rise on a granite pedestal. The polished granite pedestal is raised on a broad horizontal plane of four rectangular plates, symbolizing the stylobate - tombstone. On it are four columns of names, laid out in relief bronze letters. A volumetric image of a soldier's helmet on top of a machine gun and a laurel branch in front of the rows of names lists complete the composition of the memorial. The monument is listed in the 2010 edition of the state list of historical and cultural monuments of local importance in Alma-Ata.

Gallery

References

Almaty
Parks in Almaty
Urban public parks